Gerry Hughes may refer to:

 Gerry Hughes (sailor), first profoundly deaf man to sail single-handed across the Atlantic Ocean
 Gerry Hughes (camogie), former camogie player